Take It All may refer to:
"Take It All" (song), a song from the 2009 film Nine performed by Marion Cotillard
"Take It All", a song by Pop Evil from Up
Take It All (game show), an NBC game show hosted by Howie Mandel
"Take It All", a song by Adele from 21
"Take It All", a song by Badfinger from Straight Up
"Take It All", a 2006 song by Hillsong United from United We Stand  
"Take It All", a song by The Reason 4
"Take It All", a song by Trust Company from The Lonely Position of Neutral
Passion: Take It All, a live album by Passion Conferences
Take It All, an English title of the 1963 film À tout prendre

See also
Take It All Away, an album by Ryan Cabrera
"The Winner Takes It All", a song by ABBA
"Take It All Away", a song by Owl City from Shooting Star (EP)